Machadinho d'Oeste is a municipality located in the Brazilian state of Rondônia. Its population was 40,867 (2020) and its area is 8,509 km².

The municipality contains part of the  Jaru Biological Reserve, a fully protected conservation unit created in 1984.
It also contains 13% of the Campos Amazônicos National Park, a  protected area created in 2006 that protects an unusual enclave of cerrado vegetation in the Amazon rainforest.

The municipality contains 78% of the Angelim Extractive Reserve and 79% of the Ipê Extractive Reserve.
It also contains the Castanheira, Freijó, Garrote, Itaúba, Jatobá, Maracatiara, Massaranduba, Mogno, Piquiá, Roxinho and Sucupira extractive reserves.

References

Municipalities in Rondônia